Statistics of México Primera División Primera Fuerza in season 1934-35.

Overview
Necaxa won the championship.

League standings

Top goalscorers
Players sorted first by goals scored, then by last name.

References
Mexico - List of final tables (RSSSF)

Primera Fuerza seasons
Mex
1934–35 in Mexican football